Bulinus succinoides is a species of freshwater snail, a gastropod in the Planorbidae family. It is endemic to Lake Malawi.

References

Invertebrates of Malawi
Bulinus
Gastropods described in 1877
Taxonomy articles created by Polbot
Fauna of Lake Malawi